Miss Universe 2009 was the 58th Miss Universe pageant, held at the Imperial Ballroom in Atlantis Paradise Island, Nassau, The Bahamas on August 23, 2009.

At the end of the event, Dayana Mendoza of Venezuela crowned Stefanía Fernández of Venezuela as Miss Universe 2009. This marks the first and so far, the only time in Miss Universe history that a country has won for two consecutive years.

Contestants from 83 countries and territories competed in this year's pageant. The competition was hosted by Billy Bush and Claudia Jordan; Bush last served as host during Miss Universe 2005. Heidi Montag, Flo Rida, Kelly Rowland, and David Guetta performed in this year's pageant.

The competition also featured the debut of the new Diamond Nexus Crown. For the first time ever, fans are able to vote between three designs for the new crown. The fans voted for the Peace crown, which is set with 1,371 gemstones, weighing a total of 416.09 carats or 83.218 g. It is made with an alloy that contains 544.31 grams of 14k and 18k white gold as well as platinum. The crown also featured synthetic rubies to represent the main advocacy of Miss Universe which is HIV/AIDS education and awareness. It is considered to be an eco-friendly crown due to its synthetic stone materials.

Background

Location and date
Donald Trump, president of the Miss Universe Organization, had intentions on holding the 2009 pageant in Dubai. However, the negotiations did not materialize due to the political instability regarding relations between the United Arab Emirates and Israel and also for religious reasons. Croatia was also interested in hosting the 2009 pageant. However, the country withdrew its bid to host the contest due to economic problems related to the current global economic crisis.

On July 1, 2008, investor Jonathan Westbrook tried launched a bid for Australia to host the 2009 edition of the pageant. However, his efforts were in vain as the possible venues were not interested. Eventually, on March 3, 2009, the Miss Universe Organization announced that the competition would be at the Atlantis Paradise Island in Nassau, The Bahamas. The pageant would initially take place on August 25, however, the contest was moved to August 23, 2009.

Selection of participants 
Contestants from 83 countries and territories were selected to compete in the competition. Four of these delegates were appointees to their positions after being a runner-up of their national pageant or being selected through a casting process, while another was selected to replace the original dethroned winner.

Angenie Simon, the first runner-up of Miss Curaçao 2009, was appointed to represent Curaçao after Ashanta Macauly, Miss Curaçao 2009, withdrew due to unknown health problems. Bélgica Suárez, the runner-up of Miss Honduras 2008, was appointed to represent Honduras at Miss Universe due to the political crisis in Honduras. Võ Hoàng Yến, the first runner-up of Miss Universe Vietnam 2008, was appointed as Miss Universe Vietnam 2009 by UNICorp, the franchise holder of Miss Universe in Vietnam.

The 2009 edition saw the returns of Bulgaria, Ethiopia, Guyana, Iceland, Lebanon, Namibia, Romania, Sweden, and Zambia. Romania last competed in 1998, Ethiopia, Iceland, Namibia, and Sweden last competed in 2006, while the others last competed in 2007. Antigua and Barbuda, Denmark, Kazakhstan, Sri Lanka, Trinidad and Tobago, and Turks and Caicos withdrew. Olga Nikitina of Kazakhstan withdrew due to lack of sponsorship, while Faith Landers of Sri Lanka withdrew due to undisclosed reasons. Jewel Selver of Turks and Caicos withdrew from the competition 24 hours before the final due to dehydration. However, Selver was still included at the parade of nations at the beginning of the final telecast. Antigua and Barbuda, Denmark, and Trinidad and Tobago withdrew after their respective organizations failed to hold a national competition or appoint a delegate.

Sorene Maratita of the Northern Mariana Islands was set to compete at Miss Universe. However, Maratita withdrew due to lack of sponsorship and funding.

Incidents before the pageant 
On August 1, 2009 Bolivian officials stated that it could present a legal challenge to the organizers of Miss Universe due to the planned use of a typical Diablada costume by the Peruvian candidate Karen Schwarz. Pablo Groux, Bolivian minister of Culture, said that any use of the costume by Schwarz in the contest would be an unlawful appropriation of Bolivian heritage and threatened to bring the case to the International Court of Justice. El Comercio, a Peruvian newspaper, mentioned that this is not the first time the diablada costume is shown in the contest and that it was María Josefa Isensee, a Chilean, that first used it in the Miss Universe contest. The Peruvian foreign minister José Antonio García Belaúnde said that since the diablada dress is of indigenous Aymara origin it can not be considered exclusive of any of the countries where Aymaras lives.

Results

Placements

Final scores

Special awards

Best National Costume

Pageant

Format
Same with 2007, 15 semifinalists were chosen through the preliminary competition— composed of the swimsuit and evening gown competitions and closed-door interviews. The top 15 competed in the swimsuit competition and were narrowed down to the top 10 afterward. The top 10 competed in the evening gown competition and were narrowed down to the top 5 afterward. The top 5 competed in the question and answer round and the final look.

Selection committee

Preliminary competition 
 Mark Wylie – Best Buddies Talent Executive
 Adriana Ching – Licensed attorney and a former real estate developer avid philanthropist
 Todd Winston – Veteran of the hospitality industry and Vice President of Sales at Creative Promotional
 Rosalina Lydster – Fashion designer for celebrities
 Tiza Tjokroadisumarto – Director of Retail Operations for Michael Kors
 Corinne Nicolas – President of Trump Model Management
 David Friedman – Last Call with Carson Daly Executive Producer
 Steven Schillaci – Talent Producer for many hit shows including American Idol
 Mario Mosley – Hollywood Choreographer of Oxygen's Dance Your Ass Off
 Sarah Markantonis – Ambassador of Kerzner International Bahamas

Final telecast 
 Dean Cain – Actor and producer
 Tamara Tunie – Actress, "Law & Order: Special Victims Unit"
 Colin Cowie – Author, Television Personality and Designer to the Stars
 Valeria Mazza – International Supermodel
 Matthew Rolston – Leading Photographer and director
 Richard LeFrak – Chairperson, President and CEO LeFrak Organization
 Andre Leon Talley – Award-winning Writer and editor
 Heather Kerzner – Philanthropist and Ambassador for Kerzner International and Resorts
 Farouk Shami – Founder and Chairman of CHI Hair Care
 Keisha Whitaker – Fashion Maven and Founder of the Kissable Couture Lip Gloss line
 Gerry DeVeaux – Award-winning Producer, Songwriter and Style Guru
 George J. Maloof, Jr. – Professional Sports Mogul and Hotelier

Contestants 
83 contestants competed for the title.

Notes

References

External links
 Official website

2009
2009 in the Bahamas
2009 beauty pageants
Nassau, Bahamas
August 2009 events in North America